Hans Knecht (26 September 1913 in Albisrieden – 8 March 1986 in Zürich) was a Swiss professional road racing cyclist. The highlight of his career was winning the World Cycling Championship in 1946. He was the Swiss National Road Race champion in 1943, 1946 and 1947. He was a professional cyclist from 1939 to 1949.

References

External links

1913 births
1985 deaths
Swiss male cyclists
UCI Road World Champions (elite men)
Cyclists from Zürich